On October 28, 2013, residents of Davao del Sur voted in a plebiscite to approve or disapprove the creation of the then proposed province of Davao Occidental.

Background
The creation of Davao Occidental was first proposed by then Davao del Sur congressman, Marc Douglas Cagas IV in 2013, while his father, Douglas Cagas, was still the governor of Davao del Sur. The proposed province was to compose all municipalities of Davao del Sur under the 2nd legislative district at that time. Cagas withdrew his proposal as the 2013 Philippine elections drew near.

The proposal was revived by Franklin Bautista 2nd district congressman of Davao del Sur. Bautista passed a law proposing the creation of the province, was passed in Congress, and approved by President Benigno Aquino III. Bautista's version of the law has a more limited scope with the municipalities of Santa Maria, Malita, Don Marcelino, Jose Abad Santos and Sarangani proposed to form Davao Occidental. Cagas' version included the municipalities of Kiblawan, Malalag and Sulop. The three municipalities opted out from being a part of the province proposed by Bautista.

By virtue of Republic Act 10360 enacted on July 23, 2013, the province is the newest in the country, carved out from the southern part of Davao del Sur. RA 10360 was passed by the House of Representatives and Senate on November 28, 2012, and December 5, 2012, respectively, and signed by President Benigno Aquino III on January 14, 2013. A plebiscite was to be held to ratify the law.

A majority vote of those who participated in the plebiscite was required to approve or disapprove the creation of Davao Occidental. Registered voters of Davao del Sur except Davao City at the time of the plebiscite were eligible to vote. The results of the plebiscite was announced by the COMELEC on October 30, 2013. Seventy-six percent of those who voted favored the creation of the new province.

Aftermath
Malita, was designated as capital of the new province and government officials of Davao del Sur with assistance from the Department of Interior and Local Government retains jurisdiction over the new province until residents of the province vote for the province's own set of government officials in 2016.

References

Provincial plebiscites in the Philippines
2013 referendums
2013 in the Philippines
History of Davao Occidental
Presidency of Benigno Aquino III
Administrative division referendums